is a railway station in the town of Misato, Miyagi Prefecture, Japan, operated by East Japan Railway Company (JR East).

Lines
Kitaura Station is served by the Rikuu East Line, and is located 4.5 rail kilometers from the terminus of the line at Kogota Station.

Station layout
The station has one island platform, connected to the station building by a level crossing. The station is unattended.

Platforms

History
Kitaura Station opened on 13 September 1914. The station was absorbed into the JR East network upon the privatization of JNR on 1 April 1987.

Surrounding area

Kitaura Station Post Office

See also
 List of Railway Stations in Japan

External links

  

Railway stations in Miyagi Prefecture
Rikuu East Line
Railway stations in Japan opened in 1914
Misato, Miyagi
Stations of East Japan Railway Company